No Kissing Under Water (German: Unter Wasser küßt man nicht) is a 1962 Austrian comedy film directed by Erich Heindl and starring Gunther Philipp, Evi Kent and Rolf Olsen.

The film's sets were designed by the art director Hans Zehetner. Location shooting took place in Greece and Italy.

Synopsis
The owner of a large bank has funded an underwater expedition Mediterranean but is angry when he discovers that his daughter has joined the expedition. He hires an incompetent private detective to track her down and bring her home to Austria.

Cast
 Gunther Philipp as Lutz Blitz
 Evi Kent as Elfie, daughter of the bank director
 Gerry Hytha as Expeditionsleiter
 Rolf Olsen as 	Lagopoulos
 Herbert Prikopa as Hafenmeister
 Silvana Sansoni as Elfie, Expeditionsteilnehmerin
 Fritz Heller as Kaiser, Präsident der CDF-Bank

References

Bibliography 
 Von Dassanowsky, Robert. Austrian Cinema: A History. McFarland, 2005.

External links 
 

1962 films
Austrian comedy films
1962 comedy films
1960s German-language films
Films shot in Greece
Films shot in Italy